Haindling is a German band founded in 1983 by Hans-Jürgen Buchner. The band specializes in Bavarian world music, a mixture of different musical styles such as pop, rock, folk, ambient, jazz and classical music. Most of the songs are written in Bavarian language. Haindling is famous for instrumentals and film scores composed by Buchner. The name of the band derives from the small village Haindling within the town of Geiselhöring in Lower Bavaria.

Description
Haindling has composed music for television series and theatrical movies, including Irgendwie und Sowieso, Zur Freiheit, Café Meineid, Der Kaiser von Schexing, Der Schandfleck, Bavaria, Margarete Steiff, among others.

Members
Hans-Jürgen Buchner (founder, composer, songwriter, sax, trumpet, keyboards, guitar, percussion, vocals)
Michael Braun (sax, trumpet, tp, mellophone, keyboards, percussion, vocals)
Peter Enderlein (drums, percussion)
Wolfgang Gleixner (bass, percussion, vocals)
Reinhold Hoffmann (keyboards, sax, oboe, mellophone, vocals)
Michael Ruff (keyboards)

Albums 

 Haindling 1 (1982, Polydor)
 Stilles Potpourri (1984, Polydor) (D# 32)
 Spinn i (1985, Polydor)
 Meuterei (1986, Polydor)
 Höhlenmalerei (1987, Polydor)
 Muh (1989, Polydor) (D# 68)
 7 (1991, Polydor)
 Haindling (1993, BMG Ariola)
 Weiß (1995, BMG Ariola) (D# 43)
 Perlen (1996 BMG Ariola)
 Zwischenlandung (1998, BMG Ariola) (D# 41)
 Tigerentenliederchen (2000, BMG Ariola)
 Filmmusik (2000, BMG Ariola) (D# 85)
 Karussell (2002, BMG Ariola) (D# 45)
 Vivaldi & Vier Jahreszeiten (2004, BMG Ariola)
 Ein Schaf denkt nach (2009, Ariola/Sony Music)

Awards 
 German Music Award, Best Album National, 1982
 Pro meritis scientiae et litterarum (2000)
 Bayerischer Verdienstorden (2005)
 Sonderpreis des Kulturpreises Bayern (2005)
 Bayerischer Poetentaler (2005)
 Bairische Sprachwurzel (2007)
 Bayerische Naturschutzmedaille (2008)
 Culture Award, Bayerische Landesstiftung (2011)
 Bayerische Verfassungsmedaille (2013)
 Sigi-Sommer-Taler (2015)
 Bayerische Staatsmedaille für besondere Verdienste um die Umwelt / Bavarian State Medal for Special Services to the Environment (2015)
 Ambassador of Kulturerbe Bayern (2018)

References 

 Michael Braun: Meine wilde Zeit mit Haindling. Rosenheimer Verlagshaus 2007,

External links 

 Official website

German musical groups